The Shrouded Isle is a management simulation video game developed and published by Kitfox Games.

Gameplay
The Shrouded Isle is a Lovecraftian-themed management simulation video game, in which the player is placed in charge of a sacrificial village cult that worships a god who intends to bring about an apocalypse in three years. The player is in charge of five families that occupy the village; their personalities, habits, and vices are procedurally generated.

Development and release
The Shrouded Isle was developed by Kitfox Games. It is the third product from the four-person independent video game development studio. It is based on The Sacrifice, a game the team had created for a game jam in 2015. The Shrouded Isle was announced in October 2016 with a scheduled released date of February 2017, however the game was released a later date of 4 August 2017 for Windows and macOS. The game was subsequently released for Nintendo Switch on 17 January 2019.

References

External links
 

2017 video games
Construction and management simulation games
Indie video games
Kitfox Games games
MacOS games
Nintendo Switch games
Single-player video games
Video games based on works by H. P. Lovecraft
Video games developed in Canada
Windows games
Video games about cults